Mike Testwuide (born February 5, 1987) is an American-born South Korean professional ice hockey right winger for the Daemyung Killer Whales. He was a member of South Korea's 2018 Winter Olympics Ice Hockey team that competed in Pyeongchang as the host nation.

Playing career
Testwuide, who was not drafted by an NHL team, signed a two-year entry level contract with the Philadelphia Flyers on March 19, 2010 after playing four seasons of collegiate hockey with Colorado College. Midway through his third season with the Adirondack Phantoms he was traded to the Calgary Flames for Mitch Wahl.

In the 2013–14 season, Testwuide signed with Anyang Halla of the Asia League Ice Hockey. With the help of Jim Paek and the Korean Olympic Committee, he was granted citizenship of South Korea via an expedited process due to his exemplary athletic ability. In 2015, Testwuide played for the South Korean national team at the IIHF World Championship Division I. Testwuide then went on to captain the South Korean national ice hockey team at the 2018 Winter Olympics in Pyeongchang.

Career statistics

Regular season and playoffs

International

References

External links
 
Mike Testwuide's profile at HockeysFuture.com

1987 births
Abbotsford Heat players
Adirondack Phantoms players
American men's ice hockey right wingers
HL Anyang players
Colorado College Tigers men's ice hockey players
Daemyung Killer Whales players
High1 players
Living people
People from Vail, Colorado
Waterloo Black Hawks players
Ice hockey players from Colorado
South Korean ice hockey right wingers
American emigrants to South Korea
Asian Games silver medalists for South Korea
Medalists at the 2017 Asian Winter Games
Asian Games medalists in ice hockey
Ice hockey players at the 2017 Asian Winter Games
Olympic ice hockey players of South Korea
Ice hockey players at the 2018 Winter Olympics
American expatriate ice hockey players in South Korea
American expatriate ice hockey players in Canada
Naturalized citizens of South Korea